Killivalavan was a Tamil king of the Early Cholas mentioned in Sangam Literature, and of a period close to that of  Nedunkilli and Nalankilli. We have no definite details about this Chola or his reign. The only information we have is from the fragmentary poems of Sangam in the Purananuru.

Sources 
The only source available to us on Killivalavan is the mentions in Sangam poetry. The period covered by the extant literature of the Sangam is unfortunately not easy to determine with any measure of certainty. Except the longer epics Cilappatikaram and Manimekalai, which by common consent belong to the age later than the Sangam age, the poems have reached us in the forms of systematic anthologies. Each individual poem has generally attached to it a colophon on the authorship and subject matter of the poem, the name of the king or chieftain to whom the poem relates and the occasion which called forth the eulogy are also found.

It is from these colophons and rarely from the texts of the poems themselves, that we gather the names of many Kings and chieftains and the poets and poetesses patronised by them. The task of reducing these names to an ordered scheme in which the different generations of contemporaries can be marked off one another has not been easy. To add to the confusions, some historians have even denounced these colophons as later additions and untrustworthy as historical documents.

Any attempt at extracting a systematic chronology and data from these poems should be aware of the casual nature of these poems and the wide difference between the purposes of the anthologist who collected these poems and the historian’s attempts are arriving at a continuous history.

More than one Killivalavan

There are a number of poems in Purananuru sung in praise of the Killivalavan who died at Kulamuttram (Kulamuttrathu Tunjiya Killivalavan) and a solitary poem of another Killivalavan who died at Kurappalli. As Kovur Kilar is the poet who has written about these two Killis, it is reasonable to suppose that these two kings are identical.

SriRangam Temple

The Vimana of Srirangam temple originally came out of "parkadal" with the powers of Brahma Deva. The Incarnation of lord Vishnu called Ramavathara has performed poojas to this Vimana. But as a symbol of love he gave this vimana to vibishana (brother of Ravana). With a condition, to not to keep that on earth. While He took this Vimana and was traveling towards Sri Lanka, Lord Vinayaka played a trick and made that to stick on the region now called Srirangam, on the banks of River Cauvery. Then Chola kings namely Dharmavarcholan and KilliValavan developed the shrine into Big Temple seen now. They have laid the basic foundations and primary buildings of the great Temple.

Killivalavan’s Reign

Killivalavan is celebrated in eighteen songs by ten different minstrels and himself figures as the author of a poem sung in praise of his friend Pannan who was the chieftain of Sirukudi (Purananuru – 173). Urayur was the capital of Killivalavan (Purananuru – 69).

Killivalavan was a capable king and was both brave and generous, but somewhat headstrong. A great deal of good advice was very tactfully offered to him by the poets.

Siege of Karur

The siege and capture of the Chera capital Karur was the standout military achievement of Killivalavan’s reign and has been the subject of a number of poems. The poet Alattur Kilar made an effort to divert Killivalavan’s attention from this enterprise in order to save Karur from destruction by gently chiding him for pitting himself against an enemy unworthy of his prowess (Purananuru – 36). However this effort was futile and the city of karur fell to the Chola.

Defeat against Pandya

Purananuru poems are silent on Killivalavan’s campaigns in the south against the Pandyas, but the poet Nakkirar in a poem in Akananuru (poem 345) makes reference to the defeat suffered by the forces of Killivalavan in the hands of the Pandya commander Palayan Maran.

Malainadu Battle

Killivalavan also waged a battle against the Malainadu chief Malayaman Tirumudikkari, who was famous for his liberal patronage of poets. The Malayaman chief was killed in battle and his two children were about to be condemned to a cruel death by the victorious Chola. The poet Kovur Kilar again pleaded for the lives of these children (Purananuru – 46)

See also
 Sangam Literature
 Early Cholas
 Legendary early Chola kings

References 
 Mudaliar, A.S, Abithana Chintamani (1931), Reprinted 1984 Asian Educational Services, New Delhi.
 Nilakanta Sastri, K.A. (1935). The CōĻas, University of Madras, Madras (Reprinted 1984).
 Nilakanta Sastri, K.A. (1955). A History of South India, OUP, New Delhi (Reprinted 2002).
 Project Madurai – Purananuru eText - http://tamilnation.co/literature/ettuthokai/pm0057.pdf

Chola kings